The enzyme threonine aldolase is an enzyme that catalyzes the chemical reaction

L-threonine  glycine + acetaldehyde

This enzyme belongs to the family of lyases, specifically the aldehyde-lyases, which cleave carbon-carbon bonds. The systematic name of this enzyme class is L-threonine acetaldehyde-lyase (glycine-forming). This enzyme is also called L-threonine acetaldehyde-lyase. This enzyme participates in glycine, serine and threonine metabolism. It employs one cofactor, pyridoxal phosphate.

Structural studies

Presence in human and mouse 
The enzyme is synthesized and functional in mice.

Humans also have the remnants of the gene, coding this enzyme (GLY1), however it is damaged by past mutations and inactive. Human gene contains two single nucleotide deletions causing frameshifts and premature stop codons. Also, the encoded protein would not be active anyway due mutations in other highly conserved regions. Human gene is no longer transcribed into RNA.

References

 
 
 

EC 4.1.2
Pyridoxal phosphate enzymes
Enzymes of known structure
Pseudogenes